A brake (French: break) was a horse-drawn carriage used in the 19th and early 20th centuries in the training of horses for draft work, or an early automobile of similar body design. A shooting-brake was a brake pressed into service to carry beaters, gamekeepers and sportsmen with their dogs, guns and game. 

There were purpose-built shooting-brakes designed to carry the driver and a footman or gamekeeper at the front facing forward, and passengers on longitudinal benches, with their dogs, guns and game borne along the sides in slatted racks.

In the 19th century, a brake was a large, four-wheeled carriage-frame with no body, used for breaking in young horses, either singly or in teams of two or four. It has no body parts except for a high seat upon which the driver sits and a small platform for a helper immediately behind.
 
If the passenger seats were made permanent the vehicle might be described as a waggonette.  

When automobiles were first developed, the term "brake" was also applied to those with bodies similar to a horse-drawn brake. Currently the word is sometimes used for an estate car (see also shooting-brake) or station wagon. In France, the term break is synonymous with a station wagon, having been called a break de chasse, literally translated: hunting break.

See also 
 Carriage

External links

Sporting Carriages – Coson Carriage Tour and *Wagonette or Body Break. Carriage Association of America. Illustrations and text. 
The Long Island Museum of American Art, History & Carriages, Stony Brook, New York: Collection Database. Search break; illustrations and text

Carriages